Shirley Cain (born Shirley Roberts;  April 30, 1935) is a British actress of film and television. She graduated from RADA in 1954, and was married to the TV executive John Cain.

Filmography

References

External links 

1935 births
Living people
British stage actresses
British television actresses
Actresses from the West Midlands (county)
20th-century British actresses
20th-century English women
20th-century English people